Enrique Labo Revoredo (March 2, 1939 – July 2, 2014) was a Peruvian football referee.

Born in Lima, he is known for having refereed the historic West Germany vs Algeria match at the 1982 FIFA World Cup in Spain. Labo also refereed at the 1980 Summer Olympics. He died at the age of 75 in 2014.

References

External links
Profile

1939 births
2014 deaths
Sportspeople from Lima
Peruvian football referees
FIFA World Cup referees
1982 FIFA World Cup referees
Olympic football referees
Football referees at the 1980 Summer Olympics
20th-century Peruvian people
21st-century Peruvian people